The 2003 Mnet Music Video Festival (MMF) was the fifth of the annual music awards in Seoul, South Korea that took place on November 27, 2003, at the Kyung Hee University.

Leading the nominees were duo Big Mama and solo artist Lee Hyori, with three each. By the end of the ceremony, Big Mama were the only ones to receive two wins, including Music Video of the Year daesang award.

Background
In its fifth year, the award-giving body continued to use the name "M.net Korean Music Festival" (MKMF) and the grand awards (or daesang) were still the Best Popular Music Video and Music Video of the Year. However, the event took place at the Kyung Hee University for the first time. Singer-actor Cha Tae-hyun came back to host the event for the third time, together with Sung Yu-ri.

During this year, the category for Best Indie Performance was discontinued.

Selection process and judging criteria
During the preliminary screening, the committee selected the nominees who released their singles and albums from November 2002 to October 2003. Afterwards, the official website of Mnet was opened so that fans will be able to vote their for candidates. In the same way, the professional juries have chosen from the nominees as well. The votes from both the fans and the judges were combined for the winners of each category.

Winners and nominees
Winners are listed first and highlighted in boldface.

Special awards
 Mobile Popularity Award: Rain – "Ways To Avoid The Sun"
 Special Jury Prize: Cho PD – "Secret Diary" (비밀일기)
 Netizen Popularity Award: Shinhwa – "Your Wedding

Multiple awards

Artist(s) with multiple wins
The following artist(s) received two or more wins (excluding the special awards):

Artist(s) with multiple nominations
The following artist(s) received two or more nominations:

Performers and presenters
The following individuals and groups, listed in order of appearance, presented awards or performed musical numbers.

Performers

Presenters

References

External links
 Mnet Asian Music Awards  official website

MAMA Awards ceremonies
Mnet Music Video Festival
Mnet Music Video Festival
Mnet Music Video Festival
Mnet Music Video Festival, 2003